Steelhead Provincial Park is a provincial park in British Columbia, Canada, located at the west end of Kamloops Lake near the town of Savona.

Established in 1995, Steelhead (Sk'emqin) Provincial Park is located on land that holds significant archeological value.  The site had been used by the Secwepemc people for 7,000 to 10,000 year and in more recent history, was the site of pioneer homestead, ferry landing, stagecoach depot.  A few historical buildings and a cemetery can still be found within the park boundaries.

References

Provincial parks of British Columbia
Thompson Country
Protected areas established in 1993
1993 establishments in British Columbia